Destroyed Armenian monastic complex of a few churches in Iĝdir province of modern Turkey.

Word formation
Monastery of Agarak was named by its settlement's name. Name Agarak is a historical name of the Egrek settlement in Iĝdir province of modern Turkey. Agarak  in Armenian for farm.

History
The monastery of Agarak was founded by Nerses Shinarar  catholicos of Armenia sometime between 649-653 A.D. Agarak situated in the Jakatk' district of Historical Armenia's Ayrarat province that in 1918-1920 was attached to Surmari (acronym of words Saint Mary) district of Republic of Armenia in the 1920.

Current condition 
The monastery today is a completely ruined structure in the village of Ekrek in Iĝdir province of Turkey.

Appearance
The monastery had a few churches and many well carved khachkar-monuments (cross-stones) nearby. Main church was named as Sourb Stephanos (Saint Stephanus). Cross-domed church's roof had been tiled, and dome's top was made of a spherical stone crowned with a cross. Many architectural fragments had been found around the churches, including remains of a medieval stele with a statue of a woman holding a model of a basilica-church in her arms.

Armenian churches in Turkey
Christian monasteries established in the 7th century
1920 disestablishments in the Ottoman Empire
Armenian buildings in Turkey
7th-century churches in Turkey